The Speaker of the Parliament of Nauru is the presiding officer of that legislature in the Republic of Nauru. The Speaker is elected by the members in the Parliament of Nauru.

A list of the office holders follows.

List

References

Parliament, Speakers
Nauru
 
Speakers of the Parliament
Parliament, Speakers